Denis Bališ (born 7 April 1992) is a Slovak football defender who plays for Neded. He made his league debut for Spartak Trnava on 25 May 2011 against Ružomberok.

He is the son of Igor Bališ and brother of Boris Bališ.

References

External links
at spartak.sk

1992 births
Living people
Slovak footballers
Association football defenders
FC Spartak Trnava players
Slovak Super Liga players